Comarca de Alhama is a comarca in the province of Granada, Spain.  The southern portion of the comarca contains the Sierras of Tejeda, Almijara and Alhama Natural Park.

It contains the following municipalities:

 Agrón
 Alhama de Granada
 Arenas del Rey
 Cacín
 Chimeneas
 Escúzar
 Jayena
 La Malahá
 Santa Cruz del Comercio
 Ventas de Huelma
 Zafarraya

References 

Comarcas of the Province of Granada